The British Rail Class 306 was a type of electric multiple unit (EMU) introduced in 1949.

Overview 
Class 306 trains were built to a pre-World War II design by Birmingham Railway Carriage and Wagon Company (Driving Trailer) and Metro Cammell (Driving Motor Brake and Trailer) and were equipped with Metrovick traction equipment Crompton Parkinson traction motors. Each carriage featured two sets of twin pneumatic sliding passenger doors, which could be opened by either the guard or the passengers, who could use buttons fitted inside and outside the doors. The order was placed by the LNER in 1938 but official delivery did not commence until February 1949.

When built the trains were energised at 1,500 V direct current (DC) which was collected from overhead wires by a diamond pantograph located above the cab on the Motor Brake Second Open (MBSO) vehicle.

From 1959 to 1961 the overhead wires were re-energised at 25 kV alternating current (ac) (and 6.25 kV ac in the inner London areas where headroom for the overhead wires was reduced) and the trains were rebuilt to use this different electrical system. A transformer and rectifier unit was fitted to the underframe between the bogies of the intermediate Trailer Brake Second (TBS) and the pantograph, now a more modern Stone Faiveley AMBR design, was moved to the roof of this carriage. Because this reduced the headroom inside the train, the guard's compartment was relocated to be directly below the pantograph. The trains were then numbered 001-092 with the last two digits of each carriage number (LNER coaching series numbers used) the same as the unit number.

Operation
Units being made up of three coaches, trains were formed up to three units (nine coaches) although off-peak trains formed of only two units (six coaches) could be seen. This meant that the standard formation could carry 528 seated passengers plus another 696 standing, making 1,224 passengers, compared with about 1,000 passengers in the steam trains that they replaced.

There is a record of a single three-coach unit hauling a Class 47 and train into Chelmsford after the locomotive failed on a London Liverpool Street to Norwich express.

Formations
The 92 units were originally numbered 01 to 92, becoming 001 to 092 upon conversion for AC operation. Coach numbers were:
DMSO: 65201 to 65292
TBSO: 65401 to 65492
DTSO: 65601 to 65692
In all cases the last two digits of the unit number matched those of the coach numbers. The whole fleet was allocated to Ilford depot.

Withdrawal and preservation 
The Class 306 trains were withdrawn in the early 1980s, with 306017 preserved at Ilford depot. It had been repainted in a near original green livery, albeit with a yellow warning panel on the front to comply with then-current safety regulations. In the early 2000s, it was restored to operational condition by First Great Eastern.

The unit was in store at MoD Kineton awaiting the resolving of issues such as asbestos contamination. The contamination was removed at Eastleigh Works and the unit was transferred by rail to the East Anglian Railway Museum in June 2011 for display as an exhibit, under a 4-year loan agreement from the National Railway Museum. It was moved to Locomotion: the National Railway Museum at Shildon in October 2018 so it can be assessed before restoration. It is scheduled to move to York when space becomes available.

See also 
Class 506 EMUs - similar to the Class 306 EMUs, but built for the  Manchester-Sheffield-Wath electric railway

References

Sources

Further reading

306
Train-related introductions in 1949